Acrometopia conspicua is a species of fly in the family Chamaemyiidae. It is found in Taiwan and is the only known representative of its genus there. The specific name conspicua refers to the conspicuousness of this fly, including the colorful head that makes this species easily recognizable.

Taxonomy
The type series was collected from Hehuanshan (Mount Hehuan, also romanized as Hohuanshan) in Nantou County in July 1990. The types were found in the unsorted material of the Taichung Museum and subsequently described as a new species in 2005 by László Papp.

Habitat
The types were collected with sweeping net. No other ecological information is available.

Description
The squamal fringe is black. The head is colorful, including frons that is orange. The face is orange dorsally and grey ventrally. The body coloration is silvery greyish, with abdominal setae originating from large round black spots. The femora are grey with yellowish basal and apical parts, the tibiae are mainly yellow, and the fore tarsi are all dark.

References

Chamaemyiidae
Diptera of Asia
Insects of Taiwan
Endemic fauna of Taiwan
Insects described in 2005